A Night at Salle Pleyel is a live instrumental album by Norwegian singer-songwriter Susanne Sundfør, released on 11 November 2011. The album was recorded at Sentrum Scene in Oslo on 18 August 2011, and served as commission piece for the Oslo Jazzfestival's 25th anniversary. It is composed solely of synthesizers with a team of four keyboardists chosen by Sundfør.

Background
The album was commissioned by the Oslo Jazzfestival, which asked Sundfør to write 44 minutes of music: "I didn't have any other restrictions or guidelines or anything. So I decided to make a piece of music for a string quintet. And then, when I started writing, during the process I got more and more convinced that this would sound really cool with just five synths. So at the beginning it sounds more like classical music and then it goes more and more into this synth world." Sundfør said she considers the album to be more of a side project to her main project.

Track listing

Credits and personnel
Credits adapted from the liner notes of A Night at Salle Pleyel.

Locations
 Recorded at Sentrum Scene
 Mixed at Duper Studio
 Mastered at Digital Domain

Personnel
 Susanne Sundfør – composition, Waldorf Blofeld Synthesizer, Korg KP-3 Kaosspad
 Ådne Meisfjord – Waldorf Blofeld Synthesizer, Electro-Harmonix Memory Man, Electro-Harmonix POG, Electro-Harmonix Frequency Analyser, Electro-Harmonix Holy Grail, Roland RE-20 Space Echo, Robotalk Random Arpeggiator
 Morten Qvenild – Waldorf Blofeld Synthesizer, Moog Voyager Filter Section, Roland RE-20 Space Echo, Ibanez Tube Screamer Keeley Mod, Zvex Tremorama, Zvex Fuzzfactory, Moogerfooger Analog Delay, Oto Machines Biscuit, Mackie 802-VLZ3 Line Mixer
 Øystein Moen – Waldorf Blofeld Synthesizer, Elektron Octatrack, Ableton Live, Motu Express 128, Akai LPK25, Akai MPK25, Boss Spaceecho, Roland RE-20 Space Echo
 Christian Wallumrød – Waldorf Blofeld Synthesizer, Electro Harmonix Micro Synthesizer, Moogerfooger LFO
 Thomas Hukkelberg – recording
 Jørgen Træen – mixing
 Bob Katz – mastering
 MVM – design, artwork

References

2011 live albums
EMI Records albums
Live instrumental albums
Susanne Sundfør albums